The Brides of Wildcat County is a romance series books written by Jude Watson for young adults. It is set during the California Gold Rush, in the fictional town of Last Chance, and detail the lives of various girls who went West in an answer to an ad asking for potential brides for the town. The books in the series are Dangerous: Savannah's Story, Scandalous: Eden's Story, Audacious: Ivy's Story, Impetueous: Mattie's Story, and Tempesteous: Opal's Story.

References

Novel series
American romance novels
1995 novels